Seoul Air Base  (sometimes K-16 Air Base, Seoul Airport or Seongnam Air Base) is located in Seongnam city near Seoul in South Korea. Runway 19 and 20 are equipped with an ILS.

History
Korea under Japanese rule constructed 여의도 비행장(Yeouido Air Base).

Korean War
The USAF designated the Yeouido air base at K-16 during the Korean War.

USAF units based here included:
35th Fighter-Interceptor Group operating F-51s from 8 April 1951.
Detachment F, 3rd Air Rescue Squadron operating Sikorsky H-5s from 19 October 1950
2157th Air Rescue Squadron operating Sikorsky H-19s

Postwar
Yeouido Air Base closed as 1970, moved garrison to current Sinchon-ri, and named it Seoul Air Base.

The base is home to the ROKAF 15th Special Missions Wing.

The US Army's 2nd Battalion (Assault), 2nd Aviation Regiment, 2nd Infantry Division operating Sikorsky UH-60 Blackhawks is based there.

The Seoul Air Show is held annually in this airfield.

The base is used as a VIP airfield by the President of Republic of Korea and other VIPs and heads of state.

Construction of a Lotte World Tower 
On the survey conducted by Sisain Press, 86% of military pilots and air traffic controllers opposed the construction of a Lotte World Tower because of a safety hazard. They were concerned that it would interfere with the flight path.
President Lee Myeong Bak (2008-2012) got the green light for a 555 meter tall skyscraper after rebuilding the airfield to deviate from the 123-story tower in Jamsil, Seoul. The building now operates as Lotte World Tower, the tallest building in any OECD country.

See also 
 List of United States Army installations in South Korea

References

South Korean airbases
Korean War air bases
Buildings and structures in Seongnam